Cerna Gora is a village in Southern Bulgaria. The village is located in Pernik Municipality, Pernik Province. Аccording to the numbers provided by the 2020 Bulgarian census, Bogdanovdol currently has a population of 271 people with a permanent address registration in the settlement.

Geography and Culture 
Bogdanovdol village is located in Southern Bulgaria. The climate of the village is continental. It lies on the borders of the Balkan Mountains.

The village is located 12 kilometers west of Pernik, and 2 kilometers from Batanovtsi. The capital of Bulgaria, Sofia, is 39 kilometers northeast. It carries the same name as the mountain it lies in the summit of - Cerna Gora.

Nearby are the two tallest peaks of the mountain - Tumba (1158) and Vetrushka (1129)

History and Infrastructure 
The village was first created after Cerna Gora was separated from the town of Batanovtsi in the year 1991.

There is a community hall and a library in the village, alongside a grocery store and a cafe. The closest doctor, pharmacy, and school are located in Batanovtsi.

Ethnicity 
According to the Bulgarian population census in 2011.

References 

Villages in Pernik Province